The Commission on the Political and Constitutional Future of Quebec, also known as the Bélanger-Campeau Commission, was established by the Lieutenant Governor of Quebec, at the initiative of Premier Robert Bourassa, after the demise of the Meech Lake Accord. The commission was mandated to examine the political and constitutional status of Quebec and to make recommendations for changes. The Bélanger-Campeau Report was published in 1991 and revised in 2002.

Co-chairman 
 Michel Bélanger
 Jean Campeau

Deputies of the Liberal Party of Quebec 
 Robert Bourassa
 Gil Rémillard
 Claude Ryan
 Louise Bégin
 Guy Bélanger
 Claude Dauphin
 Claire-Hélène Hovington
 Cosmo Maciocia
 Christiane Pelchat
 Russ Williams

Deputies of the Parti québécois 
 Jacques Parizeau
 Jeanne Blackburn
 Jacques Brassard
 Guy Chevrette
 Louise Harel
 Jacques Léonard
 Pauline Marois

Other sovereignist commissioners 
 Lucien Bouchard
 Jean-Claude Beaumier
 Claude Béland
 Louis Laberge
 Gérald Larose
 Roger Nicolet
 Serge Turgeon
 Lorraine Pagé
 Jacques Proulx

Other federalist commissioners 
 Marcel Beaudry
 Cheryl Campbell Steer
 Ghislain Dufour
 Guy D'Anjou
 Jean-Pierre Hogue
 Richard Holden
 Charles-Albert Poissant
 André Ouellet

See also 
Allaire Report
Distinct society
Quebec nationalism
Quebec federalism
Quebec sovereigntism
Robert Bourassa's speech on the end of the Meech Lake Accord
Politics of Quebec
History of Quebec

External links 
Updated Studies originally prepared for the Commission on the Political and Constitutional Future of Québec (1990-1991)
Constitutional keywords - Belanger-Campeau commission

Political history of Quebec